Richard James Allen (4 June 1902 – 1969) was an Indian field hockey player who competed in the Summer Olympics in 1928, 1932, and 1936. He was born in Nagpur, India, and did his schooling at the prestigious Oak Grove School, Mussoorie and later at St. Joseph's College, Nainital.

In the 1928 Summer Olympics, he played five matches as goalkeeper, and no goals were scored against him. Four years later, he played one match against the United States as goalkeeper. The American team scored one goal against him, while he was off the field signing autographs (the final score was 24–1 in India's favour, a world record at that time). In the 1936 Summer Olympics he played four matches as goalkeeper. One goal was scored against him. This tally of conceding only two goals over three Olympic Games remains an Olympic record to this day.

External links
 
 Olympic profile

1902 births
Field hockey players at the 1928 Summer Olympics
Field hockey players at the 1932 Summer Olympics
Field hockey players at the 1936 Summer Olympics
Indian male field hockey players
Field hockey players from Maharashtra
Olympic field hockey players of India
Olympic gold medalists for India
1969 deaths
Anglo-Indian people
Olympic medalists in field hockey
Medalists at the 1936 Summer Olympics
Medalists at the 1932 Summer Olympics
Medalists at the 1928 Summer Olympics
Sportspeople from Nagpur